Nils Erik Flakstad (born 9 August 1907 in Hamar, died on 31 July 1979 in Oslo) was a Norwegian sculptor, son of businessperson and politician Nils Erik Flakstad.

He studied at the Norwegian National Academy of Craft and Art Industry from 1928 to 1930, and at the Norwegian National Academy of Fine Arts from 1930 to 1932.

He was a teacher at the Norwegian National Academy of Craft and Art Industry 1955–1975. He started as a painter and first began in the late 1930s with sculpture. Among his works include contributions at Oslo City Hall, in front of Haugesund City Hall, a relief of the Parliamentary stair hall at Stortinget, and monuments to fallen Norwegian patriots during World War II in Hamar, Haugesund and Akershus Fortress.

References

1907 births
1979 deaths
People from Hamar
Norwegian sculptors
Oslo National Academy of the Arts alumni
Academic staff of the Oslo National Academy of the Arts